La Secuita is a village in the province of Tarragona and autonomous community of Catalonia, Spain. With 1,177 inhabitants, La Secuita is some 266 mi (or 428 km) East of Madrid, the country's capital city.

References

External links
 Government data pages 

Municipalities in Tarragonès
Populated places in Tarragonès